Hamilton West and Earnock is one of the 20 electoral wards of South Lanarkshire Council. Created in 2007, the ward elects four councillors using the single transferable vote electoral system and covers an area with a population of 18,503 people.

The ward was previously a Labour stronghold with the party holding half of the seats between 2007 and 2017. However, it has since become a Scottish National Party (SNP) stronghold with the party holding half of the seats since a by-election win in 2011.

Boundaries
The ward was created following the Fourth Statutory Reviews of Electoral Arrangements ahead of the 2007 Scottish local elections. As a result of the Local Governance (Scotland) Act 2004, local elections in Scotland would use the single transferable vote electoral system from 2007 onwards so Hamilton West and Earnock was formed from an amalgamation of several previous first-past-the-post wards. It contained the majority of the former High Blantyre, Udston and Wellhall/Earnock wards, a small part of the former Hamilton Centre North ward and part of the former Cadzow and Woodhead/Meikle Earnock wards as well as all of the former Earnock and Hillhouse wards. Hamilton West and Earnock covers the western part of Hamilton including the Brackenhill, Earnock, High Earnock, Highstonehall, Hillhouse, Little Earnock and Udston neighbourhoods, as well as the adjoining West Craigs development. Following the Fifth Statutory Reviews of Electoral Arrangements ahead of the 2017 Scottish local elections, the ward's boundaries were unchanged.

Councillors

Election results

2022 election

2017 election

2012 election

2011 by-election

2007 election

Notes

References

Wards of South Lanarkshire
Hamilton, South Lanarkshire